Osterrieth Range is a mountain range extending in a NE-SW direction along the southeast coast of Anvers Island, in the Palmer Archipelago. Discovered by the Belgian Antarctic Expedition, 1897–99, under Gerlache, and named by him for Mme. Ernest Osterrieth, née , a patron of the expedition.

Peaks
Mount Ancla
Mount Camber
Clifford Peak
Mount Français
Mount Moberly
Mount Rennie
Mount William

References

Mountain ranges of the Palmer Archipelago